Takleh-ye Bakhsh-e Yek is a village in Tazeh Kand Rural District, Tazeh Kand District, Parsabad County, Ardabil Province, Iran. At the 2006 census, its population was 703, in 139 families.

References 

Towns and villages in Parsabad County